Sophie Otiende is a Kenyan activist and advocate for survivors of human trafficking. She is a former board member of the Global Fund to End Modern Slavery. She is currently the Chief Executive Officer at Global Fund to End Modern Slavery GFEMS and the founder of one of the first survivor led collectives in Kenya, Azadi. She is widely known for her activism on human trafficking, specifically standards of care for survivors of trafficking and inclusion of survivors of trafficking in the sector. since 2014 she has been responsible in identifying and restoring over 400 victims of human trafficking. Sophie has also drafted curriculum for training on human trafficking and support for victims of trafficking.

In 2020, Otiende was shortlisted as one of the Trafficking in Persons Report Hero of 2020 by the United States Department of state.

References 

Kenyan activists
Year of birth missing (living people)
Living people